The 1992 Lyon Grand Prix was a men's tennis tournament played on indoor carpet courts. It was played at the Palais des Sports de Gerland in Lyon, France, and was part of the 1992 ATP Tour. It was the sixth edition of the tournament and took place from 19 October through 26 October 1992. First-seeded Pete Sampras won the singles title, his second consecutive at the event.

Finals

Singles

 Pete Sampras defeated  Cédric Pioline 6–4, 6–2
 It was Sampras' 5th title of the year and the 13th of his career.

Doubles

 Jakob Hlasek /  Marc Rosset defeated  Neil Broad /  Stefan Kruger 6–1, 6–3
 It was Hlasek's 3rd title of the year and the 23rd of his career. It was Rosset's 5th title of the year and the 8th of his career.

References

External links
 ITF tournament edition details

 
Lyon Grand Prix
1992